The Russian Customs Code is the law that regulates customs for Russia. The new Customs Code of the Russian Federation was adopted on May 14, 2003, to substitute the one dated back to 1993. The need to adopt a new Code arose from the problem of the development of Russian economy and foreign trade. The new Customs Code of the Russian Federation is to increase the efficiency of custom authorities through simplifying customs formalities and procedures. Tariffs are regulated by the Russian Customs Tariff document which became eligible on April 1, 2000.

See also
Federal Customs Service of Russia

External links
Full text of the Code(pdf)
Russian customs: a barrier to foreign trade, investments and entry?
Surveys of Russian and foreign businessmen ... The government's effort to simplify customs procedures has had some success, ...

Law of Russia
Legal codes
Borders of Russia
Foreign trade of Russia